Jean Alexandre Eugène Dieudonné (1 July 1906 – 29 November 1992) was a French mathematician, notable for research in abstract algebra, algebraic geometry, and functional analysis, for close involvement with the Nicolas Bourbaki pseudonymous group and the Éléments de géométrie algébrique project of Alexander Grothendieck, and as a historian of mathematics, particularly in the fields of functional analysis and algebraic topology. His work on the classical groups (the book La Géométrie des groupes classiques was published in 1955), and on formal groups, introducing what now are called Dieudonné modules, had a major effect on those fields.

He was born and brought up in Lille, with a formative stay in England where he was introduced to algebra. In 1924 he was admitted to the École Normale Supérieure, where André Weil was a classmate. He began working in complex analysis. In 1934 he was one of the group of normaliens convened by Weil, which would become 'Bourbaki'.

Education and teaching 
He served in the French Army during World War II, and then taught in Clermont-Ferrand until the liberation of France. After holding professorships at the University of São Paulo (1946–47), the University of Nancy (1948–1952) and the University of Michigan (1952–53), he joined the Department of Mathematics at Northwestern University in 1953, before returning to France as a founding member of the Institut des Hautes Études Scientifiques. He moved to the University of Nice to found the Department of Mathematics in 1964, and retired in 1970. He was elected as a member of the Académie des Sciences in 1968.

Career 
Dieudonné drafted much of the Bourbaki series of texts, the many volumes of the EGA algebraic geometry series, and nine volumes of his own Éléments d'Analyse. The first volume of the Traité is a French version of the book Foundations of Modern Analysis (1960), which had become a graduate textbook on functional analysis.

He also wrote individual monographs on Infinitesimal Calculus, Linear Algebra and Elementary Geometry, invariant theory, commutative algebra, algebraic geometry, and formal groups.

With Laurent Schwartz he supervised the early research of Alexander Grothendieck. Later from 1959 to 1964 he was at the Institut des Hautes Études Scientifiques alongside Grothendieck, and collaborating on the expository work needed to support the project of refounding algebraic geometry on the new basis of schemes.

Selected works 

 9 volumes of Éléments d'analyse (1960-1982), éd. Gauthier-Villars

; Eng. trans: 

 (a reprint of )

; Eng. trans:

References

External links 

 A talk on the history of Algebraic Geometry given by Jean Dieudonné at the Department of Mathematics of the University of Wisconsin-Milwaukee in 1972 has been recently restored and is available here
 Dieudonné appears in the Horizon BBC documentary A Mathematical Mystery Tour

1906 births
1992 deaths
20th-century French mathematicians
Algebraic geometers
French historians of mathematics
École Normale Supérieure alumni
Nicolas Bourbaki
Academic staff of the University of São Paulo
Members of the French Academy of Sciences
Scientists from Lille
Academic staff of Nancy-Université
University of Michigan faculty
Academic staff of Côte d'Azur University